The following is a list of events affecting Mexican television in 2021. Events listed include television show debuts, finales, and cancellations; channel launches, closures, and re-brandings; stations changing or adding their network affiliations; and information about controversies and carriage disputes.

Events 

 31 December - Mexico's last English language television outlet, Border blasting station XHRIO-TDT in Matamoros, Tamaulipas, affiliated with the American-based The CW network, ceased operations after almost 42 years on the air.

Programs on-air

1970s
Plaza Sesamo (1972–present)

1990s
Acapulco Bay (1995–present) 
Corazon salvaje (1993–present) 
Esmeralda (1997–present) 
La usurpadora (1998–present)

2000s
Alma de hierro (2008–present) 
Big Brother México (2002-2005, 2015–present)
Hotel Erotica Cabo (2006–present) 
Lo Que Callamos Las Mujeres (2001–present)

2010s 
40 y 20 (2016–present) 
Atrapada (2018–present) 
 Casa de las Flores (2018–present)
Como dice el dicho (2011–present) 
El Chiapo (2017–present) 
La Voz… México (2011–present) 
Por amar sin ley (2018–present) 
México Tiene Talento (2014–present) 
Rubirosa (2018–present) 
Sin tu mirads (2017–present) 
Soltereo con hijas (2019–present) 
Valiant Love (2012–present)

Television stations

Station launches

Station closures

Deaths

See also
List of Mexican films of 2021
2021 in Mexico

References